Oak was a station on the Chicago Transit Authority's North Side Main Line, which is now part of the Brown Line. The station was located at 319 W. Oak Street in the Near North Side neighborhood of Chicago. Oak was situated south of Division, which closed at the same time as Oak, and north of Chicago. Oak opened in 1906 and closed on August 1, 1949, along with 22 other stations as part of a CTA service revision.

References

Defunct Chicago "L" stations
Railway stations in the United States opened in 1906
Railway stations closed in 1949
1906 establishments in Illinois
1949 disestablishments in Illinois